The Théâtre de la Michodière is a theatre building and performing arts venue, located at 4 bis,  in the 2nd arrondissement of Paris.

History 
On the site of the Hotel de Lorge, sold in lots, the rue de la Michodiere opened in 1778. Around the place where the Gaillon gate stood at the enclosure of Louis XIII, in 1925, the architect  built a theatre in the Art Deco style. Decorated by Jacques-Émile Ruhlmann, the red and gold auditorium could accommodate 800 spectators, but in the 21st century, it has only 700 seats left.

Unlike the West End, where the activities of "bricks and mortar" and producers tend to be separate, Parisian commercial theatres are producing houses. Management decides on the artistic policy, and shows are financed by the theatre, albeit sometimes in co-production with a touring management that hopes to profit from a Parisian success to take a show out on tour.

Inaugurated on 16 November 1925 under the management of Gustave Quinson, from 1927 to 1977 it was run by actor-managers who made the success of its shows: Victor Boucher, Yvonne Printemps, Pierre Fresnay, François Périer, with works by Édouard Bourdet, André Roussin, Jean Anouilh, Marcel Achard and Françoise Dorin. By public demand, the theatre specialised in boulevard plays, as evidenced by the many old posters that could be seen on its walls. The theatre was co-directed by Fresnay and Printemps until his death in 1975. Printemps remained alone at the head of the theatre, until she died in 1977.

The theatre went into receivership, and after a brief period of being run by ATECA association, was bought from the receivers in September 1981 by Jacques Crepineau, who, unlike his predecessors, was not an actor, but still performed the role of artistic director.

In April 2014, vente-privee.com bought the theatre. Richard Caillat and Stéphane Hillel were nominated as co-directors.

In November 2019, Fimalac Entertainment bought a majority shareholding in the theatre.

In January 2022, Marc Lesage took over from Stéphane Hillel to become co-director with Richard Caillat.

Repertoire

Management by Gustave Quinson 
 1925: L'Infidèle éperdue by Jacques Natanson, 16 November
 1926: Passionnément 3-act operetta by Maurice Hennequin and Albert Willemetz, music by André Messager, 15 January
 1926: Le Temps d'aimer by Pierre Wolff, Henri Duvernois, couplets Hugues Delorme, music Reynaldo Hahn, 6 November

Management by Victor Boucher 
 1927: L'Enlèvement de Paul Armont and Marcel Gerbidon, 6 September
 1927:  4-act comedy by Édouard Bourdet, directed by Victor Boucher, 25 November
 1928: Sur mon beau navire, three-act comedy by Jean Sarment, 30 November
 1929: Le Trou dans le mur, 4-act comedy by Yves Mirande, 1 February
 1929: La Vie de château, 3-act comedy  by Ferenc Molnár, 29 May
 1929: , 3-act comedy  by Édouard Bourdet, 10 December
 1932: La Banque Nemo, play in 3 acts and 9 tableaux by Louis Verneuil, 21 November
 1932: La Fleur des pois 4-act comedy  by Édouard Bourdet, 4 October
 1933: Le Vol nuptial 3-act comedy  by  Francis de Croisset, 1 April 
 1934: Les Temps difficiles 4-act play by Édouard Bourdet, 30 January
 1934: Les Vignes du seigneur by Robert de Flers and Francis de Croisset, 
 1934: Do, Mi, Sol, Do 3-act comedy  by Paul Géraldy, 21 December
 1935: Bichon 4-act play  by  Jean de Létraz, 3 May
 1936:  5-act play by Édouard Bourdet, 15 October
 1937: Bureau central des idées, one-act comedy by Alfred Gehri, directed by Louis Tunc, 24 April
 1937 : Les Vignes du seigneur by Robert de Flers and Francis de Croisset,

Management by Victor Boucher and Yvonne Printemps 
 1939: Trois Valses by Léopold Marchand and Albert Willemetz, directed by Pierre Fresnay, June 
 1940: La Familiale by Jean de Létraz, with François Périer, 9 February
 1940: Léocadia by Jean Anouilh, 28 November
 1940:  by Armand Salacrou, directed by Alice Cocéa
 1941: Hyménée, four-act play by Édouard Bourdet, 7 May

Management by Pierre Fresnay and Yvonne Printemps 
 1941: Comédie en trois actes, by Henri-Georges Clouzot,
 1942: , by Édouard Bourdet, 15 December
 1943: Le Voyageur sans bagage, play in five tableaux by Jean Anouilh, 1 April
 1944: Le Dîner de famille, three-act play by Jean Bernard-Luc, directed by Jean Wall, 1 December
 1944: Père, by Édouard Bourdet,
 1945: , by Édouard Bourdet,
 1946: Auprès de ma blonde by Marcel Achard, directed by Pierre Fresnay, 7 May
 1946: Si je voulais… by Paul Géraldy and Robert Spitzer 
 1947: Le Prince d'Aquitaine, three-act comedy , May 
 1947: Savez-vous planter les choux ?, by Marcel Achard, directed by Pierre Fresnay, 25 September 
 1948: K.M.X labrador, by Jacques Deval after H. W. Reed, directed by the author, 29 January
 1948: Pauline ou l'Écume de la mer, two-act play by Gabriel Arout, 17 June
 1948: Du côté de chez Proust, by Curzio Malaparte, 22 November 
 1948:  by André Roussin, directed by Pierre Fresnay, 22 November
 1949: L'École des dupes, 1-act comedy by André Roussin, directed by the author, 2 June
 1950:  by André Roussin, directed by the author, 14 March
 1951: Le Moulin de la galette, three-act play by Marcel Achard, directed by Pierre Fresnay, 17 December 
 1952: Hyménée, by Édouard Bourdet, 
 1952: Un beau dimanche, play in three-act and five tableaux by Jean-Pierre Aumont, after the novel Rencontre by Pierre Larthomas, 29 June
 1953: Le Ciel de lit play in three-act and six tableaux by Jan de Hartog,  directed by Pierre Fresnay, 14 April 
 1953: Histoire de rire, by Armand Salacrou
 1954: Les Cyclones, by Jules Roy, directed by Pierre Fresnay, 10 September
 1954: Voici le jour, three-act play by Jean Lasserre, with Pierre Fresnay, 22 April 
 1955: Les Grands Garçons, by Paul Géraldy, 
 1955: Les Œufs de l'autruche, by André Roussin, directed by Pierre Fresnay, 10 March
 1955: Le Mal d'amour by Marcel Achard, directed by François Périer

Management Pierre Fresnay, Yvonne Printemps and François Périer 
 1956: Le Séducteur, three-act comedy by Diego Fabbri, directed by François Périer, 13 January 
Bobosse by André Roussin, directed by the author, 10 September
 1958: Père by Édouard Bourdet, directed by Pierre Fresnay, 9 September
 1959: Gog et Magog, by  Roger MacDougall and Ted Allan, translation Gabriel Arout, directed by François Périer, 3 September
 1962: , by Romain Gary, directed by François Périer, 10 September
 1963: L’Équation ou Une heure avec Monsieur Zweistein, by Jacques Perry, 4 February
 1963: L'Homme et la perruche, by Alain Allioux, 28 September
 1964: La Preuve par quatre, by Félicien Marceau, directed by the author, 4 February 
 1965: La Preuve par quatre, by Félicien Marceau, directed by the author, April 
 1966: , three-act comedy by Marcelle Maurette and Marc-Gilbert Sauvajon, directed by Pierre Fresnay, 4 October

Management by Pierre Fresnay, Yvonne Printemps 
 1967: Comme au théâtre, by Françoise Dorin, directed by Michel Roux, 2 February
 1968: Visitations, by Jean Giraudoux, 15 June
 1968: , by Marcel Achard, directed by Michel Roux 7 September
 1969: La Tour d'Einstein by Christian Liger, directed by Pierre Fresnay and Julien Bertheau, 10 January
 1969: La Paille humide, by Albert Husson, Michel Roux, 20 February
 1969: On ne sait jamais, by André Roussin, directed by the author, 12 September
 1970: Une poignée d'orties, by Marc-Gilbert Sauvajon, directed by Jacques-Henri Duva], 4 September
 1970: Le Procès Karamazov by Diego Fabbri after Dostoievski, directed by Pierre Franck, 15 October
 1970: , by Paul Valéry, directed by Pierre Franck 
 1970: Jeu, set et match  by Anthony Shaffer, directed by Clifford Williams, 18 December
 1971: Et alors ? by Bernard Haller, 9 September
 1971:  by Paul Valéry, directed by Pierre Franck 
 1971: Le Client by Jean-Claude Carrière, directed by the author
 1972: Et alors ? by Bernard Haller, 1 August
 1972: La Claque by André Roussin, directed by the author, 17 October
 1975: Gog et Magog by Roger MacDougall and Ted Allan, directed by François Périer, 
 1976: Voyez-vous ce que je vois ? and Ray Cooney and John Chapman, directed by Jean Le Poulain, 19 February
 1977: Pauvre Assassin by Pavel Kohout, directed by Michel Fagadau, 30 September
 1978: Les Rustres after Carlo Goldoni, directed by Claude Santelli, 31 January
 1979: Coup de chapeau by Bernard Slade, adaptation by Pierre Barillet and Jean-Pierre Gredy, directed by Pierre Mondy, with François Périer, Daniel Auteuil, 6 September

Management by Jacques Crépineau 
 1981: Amusez-vous... Ah ces années 30 by and directed by Jacques Décombe, 2 November
 1982: Joyeuses Pâques by Jean Poiret, directed by Pierre Mondy, 15 April
 1983: Le Vison voyageur by Ray Cooney and John Chapman, directed by Jacques Sereys, 13 January (photos sur Gallica)
 1984: Banco ! by Alfred Savoir, directed by Robert Manuel, 26 January
 1984: Le Bluffeur de Marc Camoletti, directed by the author, 9 November (photos sur Gallica) 
 1986:  by Sacha Guitry, directed by Jean Meyer, 18 January
 1986: Double mixte by Ray Cooney, directed by Pierre Mondy 7 November (photos sur Gallica)
 1988: Lamy Public N°1 by and with André Lamy, 15 January 
 1988: Ma cousine de Varsovie by Georges Berr and Louis Verneuil, directed by Jean-Claude Islert, 21 June (photos sur Gallica
 1990: Tiercé gagnant by John Chapman, adaptation Stewart Vaughan and Jean-Claude Islert, directed by Christopher Renshaw, 21 September
 1991: Le Gros n'avion by Michèle Bernier, Mimie Mathy (les filles), directed by Éric Civanyan, 21 January
 1991: Pleins Feux by Mary Orr, adaptation , directed by Éric Civanyan, 26 September
 1992: Je veux faire du cinéma by Neil Simon, directed by Michel Blanc, 15 January 
 1992: La Puce à l'oreille by Georges Feydeau, directed by Jean-Claude Brialy, 17 June
 1993: Partenaires by David Mamet, directed by Bernard Stora, 4 March
 1994: Bobosse by André Roussin, directed by Stéphane Hillel, 19 May
 1995: Le Vison voyageur by Ray Cooney, directed by Patrick Guillemin, 27 May
 1995:  by Danielle Ryan and  17 October
 1996: Un grand cri d'amour by Josiane Balasko, directed by the author, with Richard Berry and Josiane Balasko, 15 January
 1996: Vacances de Reve by Francis Joffo, directed by Francis Joffo, 20 September
 1997: revival of Un grand cri d'amour by Josiane Balasko, directed by the author, with Richard Berry and Josiane Balasko, 14 January
 1997: Branquignol, 20 May
 1997: Les Palmes de monsieur Schutz by Jean-Noël Fenwick, directed by Gérard Caillaud, 1 July
 1997: Espèces menacées by Ray Cooney adaptation Gérard Jugnot, Michel Blanc, Stewart Vaughan directed by Éric Civanyan, with Gérard Jugnot, Martin Lamotte, 9 October to 31 May 1998
 1998: continuation of Espèces menacées, 25 September 1998 to 9 January 1999
 1999: continuation of Espèces menacées, with cast change, 15 January to 4 July
 1999: continuation of Espèces menacées, with second cast change, 23 September
 2001: Les Désirs sauvages de mon mari by John Tobias, adaptation Sally Micaleff, directed by Éric Civanyan, 8 February
 2001: Moi, mais en mieux by Jean-Noël Fenwick, directed by Jean-Claude Idée, 3 May
 2001: Impair et père by Ray Cooney, adaptation Stewart Vaughan and Jean-Christophe Barc, directed by Jean-Luc Moreau, with Roland Giraud, 8 November
 2004: Ciel ! Mon Feydeau ! after Georges Feydeau, adaptation Anthéa Sogno, directed by Anthéa Sogno, 14 April 
 2004: Le Canard à l'orange by William Douglas Home, adaptation Marc-Gilbert Sauvajon, directed by Gérard Caillaud, 7 October
 2005: Stationnement Alterné by Ray Cooney, adaptation Stewart Vaughan and Jean-Christophe Barc, directed by Jean-Luc Moreau, with Eric Metayer, Roland Marchisio, 6 October
 2006: Délit de Fuites by Jean-Claude Islert, directed by Jean-Luc Moreau, 5 October
 2007: Chat et Souris by Ray Cooney, adaptation Stewart Vaughan and Jean-Christophe Barc, directed by Jean-Luc Moreau, with Francis Perrin, Jean-Luc Moreau, 20 September
 2009: continuation of Chat et Souris with cast change, 23 January
 2009: Goodbye Charlie by George Axelrod, adaptation Dominique Deschamps and Didier Caron, directed by Didier Caron, with Marie-Anne Chazel, 4 September
 2010: À deux lits du délit by Derek Benfield, adaptation Stewart Vaughan and Jean-Christophe Barc, directed by Jean-Luc Moreau, with Arthur Jugnot, 16 September 
 2011: De filles en aiguilles by Robin Hawdon, adaptation Stewart Vaughan and Jean-Christophe Barc, directed by Jacques Décombe, with Alexandre Brasseur, Delphine Depardieu, 17 September
 2012: Plein la Vue by Jean Franco and Guillaume Mélanie, directed by Jean-Luc Moreau, 1 March
 2014: Hollywood, by Ron Hutchinson,  adaptation Martine Dolleans, directed by Daniel Colas, with Thierry Frémont, Pierre Cassignard, Emmanuel Patron and Françoise Pinkwasser, 24 January.

Management by Richard Caillat and Stéphane Hillel 

See also 
 List of theatres and entertainment venues in Paris

References

External links 

 Yvonne Printemps / Ephéméride, décès un 18 janvier (in French) funeraire-info.fr
 programme 1964 (in French)

la Michaudière
la Michaudière
1925 establishments in France
Theatres completed in 1925
Art Deco architecture in France